Falsirhodobacter halotolerans is a Gram-negative bacteria bacterium from the genus of Falsirhodobacter which has been isolated from soil from a solar saltern from Humma in India.

References

External links
Type strain of Falsirhodobacter halotolerans at BacDive -  the Bacterial Diversity Metadatabase

Rhodobacteraceae
Bacteria described in 2013